Brigitte Horney (29 March 1911 – 27 July 1988) was a German theatre and film actress. Best remembered was her role as Empress Katherine the Great in the 1943 version of the UFA film version of Baron Münchhausen, directed by Josef von Báky, with Hans Albers in the title role.

Early life
Brigitte Horney was born and grew up in Dahlem, Berlin, the daughter of noted psychoanalyst Karen Horney.

Career
She was, for more than a decade, engaged with Berlin's Volksbühne. When she accepted the starring role in the highly popular film Love, Death and the Devil (1934), a new star was born with the Leitmotif song "So oder so ist das Leben".

Horney was a good friend of the actor Joachim Gottschalk and appeared in four films with him. Although Gottschalk had fallen from favor with Nazi officials, Horney attended Gottschalk's funeral (Germany, 1941), regardless of the political and career implications of doing so.

Personal life
After the Second World War she became an American citizen, but continued to visit Germany frequently, where she had a house in Bavaria. She married the eminent Jewish art historian Hanns Swarzenski, a leading authority on German Romanesque manuscripts.

Death
She continued to work in films and television (i.e. Oliver Twist) until her death in Hamburg in 1988.

Selected filmography

Film

 Farewell (1930) - Hella, retailer
 Fra Diavolo (1931) - Anita
 Rasputin, Demon with Women (1932)
 The Country Schoolmaster (1933) - Martha Detlefsen
 Ein Mann will nach Deutschland (1934) - Manuela Ortiguez
 The Eternal Dream (1934) - Maria
 Love, Death and the Devil (1934) - Ruby
 Blood Brothers (1935) - Mara, die Magd
 The Eternal Dream (1935) - Marie
The Green Domino (1935) - Ellen Fehling / Marianne Fehling
 Savoy Hotel 217 (1936) - Nastasja Andrejevna Daschenko
 City of Anatol (1936) - Franziska Maniu
 The House of the Spaniard (1936) - Margarita de Guzman
 Secret Lives (1937) - Lena Schmidt
 Der Katzensteg (1937) - Dienstmagd Regine Hackelberg - Tochter
 Faded Melody (1938) - Barbara Lorenz
 Revolutionshochzeit (1938) - Aline
 Anna Favetti (1938) - Anna Favetti
 You and I (1938) - Anna Uhlig
 Uproar in Damascus (1939) - Vera Niemayer
 Target in the Clouds (1939) - Margot Boje
 The Governor (1939) - Maria
 A Woman Like You (1939) - Dr. Maria Pretorius
 Liberated Hands (1939) - Dürthen, Schafhirtin
 Enemies (1940) - Anna
 The Girl from Fano (1941) - Patricia
  (1941) - Maria Roth
 Beloved World (1942) - Karin Ranke
 Baron Munchhausen (1943) - Tsarin Catherine II
 Am Ende der Welt (1947) - Roberta Bell
  (1948) - Christine
 Verspieltes Leben (1949) - Ulyssa von Siebenmühlen
 Melody of Fate (1950)
 As Long as You're Near Me (1953) - Mona Arendt
 Prisoners of Love (1954) - Dr. Hildegard Thomas
 The Last Summer (1954) - Tatjana Tolemainen
 The Glass Tower (1957) - Dr. Bruning
 Darkness Fell on Gotenhafen (1960) - Generalin von Reuss
 The Inheritance of Bjorndal (1960) - Tante Eleonore
 The Cry of the Wild Geese (1961) - Mrs. Sandbo
 Miracle of the White Stallions (1963) - Countess Arco-Valley
 Neues vom Hexer (1965) - Lady Aston
 I Am Looking for a Man (1966) - Helene Schmidt
 The Trygon Factor (1966) - Sister General
  (1977, TV film) - Julia
 Charlotte (1981) - Grandma
 Bella Donna (1983) - Jutta

Television
 Derrick - Season 4, Episode 3: "Eine Nacht im Oktober" (1977) - Mrs. Lechner
  (1978, TV series) - Grandmother
 Derrick - Season 7, Episode 6: "Die Entscheidung" (1980) - Ina Hauff
 Huckleberry Finn and His Friends (1980, TV miniseries) - Aunt Polly
 Jakob und Adele (1982–1989, TV series) - Adele Schliemann
 Teufels Großmutter (1986, TV series) - Dorothea Teufel
 Das Erbe der Guldenburgs (1987–1989, TV series) - Hertha von Guldenburg (final appearance)

External links

Brigitte Horney - Postcards and Tobacco cards

1911 births
1988 deaths
German film actresses
German television actresses
20th-century German actresses
German stage actresses
German emigrants to the United States
Actresses from Berlin
People from Steglitz-Zehlendorf